Vostroye is a rural locality (a village) and the administrative center of Vostrovskoye Rural Settlement, Nyuksensky District, Vologda Oblast, Russia. The population was 223 as of 2002. There are 6 streets.

Geography 
Vostroye is located 62 km northeast of Nyuksenitsa (the district's administrative centre) by road. Zabolotye is the nearest rural locality.

References 

Rural localities in Nyuksensky District